Kim Bass (born 1955 or 1956) is an American film and television writer, director, and producer. His television work includes creating Sister, Sister and writing on In Living Color. Bass also created the Nickelodeon sitcom Kenan & Kel. His film credits include the movie Junkyard Dog starring Vivica A. Fox and Kill Speed.

Bass is one of the founders of the independent production company Bass Entertainment Pictures.

Bass was born in Utica, New York and is a 1974 graduate of Notre Dame Junior Senior High School. He was born to father C.W. Bass and has one brother, Kyle, and four sisters.

Filmography
Succubus: Hell-Bent, 2007 horror film directed by Kim Bass. With Gary Busey, David Keith, Lorenzo Lamas

References 

African-American television producers
African-American film directors
American television producers
American television writers
Living people
1950s births
20th-century American screenwriters
20th-century American male writers
21st-century American screenwriters
21st-century American male writers
20th-century African-American writers
21st-century African-American writers
African-American male writers